The First United Methodist Church, originally the Booneville Methodist Episcopal Church South, is a historic church building at 355 North Broadway Avenue in Booneville, Arkansas.  It is a two-story brick building with Late Gothic Revival styling, built between 1910 and 1911 for a congregation founded in 1868.  It has a gabled roof with a crenellated parapet and a buttressed tower topped by crenellated parapets.

The church was listed on the National Register of Historic Places in 2011.

See also
National Register of Historic Places listings in Logan County, Arkansas

References

External links
Booneville First United Methodist Church web site

Churches on the National Register of Historic Places in Arkansas
National Register of Historic Places in Logan County, Arkansas
Gothic Revival architecture in Arkansas
Buildings and structures completed in 1911
Buildings and structures in Booneville, Arkansas